Saint-Paul-de-Loubressac (Languedocien: Sent Pau de Laubreçac) is a former commune in the Lot department in south-western France. On 1 January 2016, it was merged into the new commune of Saint-Paul-Flaugnac. Its population was 593 in 2019.

See also
Communes of the Lot department

References

Saintpauldeloubressac